Silver Lake Institute Historic District is a national historic district located at Silver Lake in Wyoming County, New York. The properties reflect the evolution of the institute from a Methodist Revivalist summer camp in the 1870s and 1880s to a cultural, educational, and religious summer institute in the Chautauqua tradition during the 1880s and 1890s, and finally to a secular summer cottage community in the early 20th century. The focal point of the community is the  Burt Park and the district includes 72 additional properties including 70 cottages.

It was listed on the National Register of Historic Places in 1985.

The Silver Lake Institute (SLI) was officially re-confirmed in the court action of making SLI an independent organization separate from the Methodist Church. This charter change was re-stated in NYS Supreme Court, Warsaw, NY, on Feb. 2, 2016.

References

External links
Silver Lake Institute Historic District - Silver Lake, New York - U.S. National Register of Historic Places on Waymarking.com

Historic districts on the National Register of Historic Places in New York (state)
Gothic Revival architecture in New York (state)
Colonial Revival architecture in New York (state)
Historic districts in Wyoming County, New York
National Register of Historic Places in Wyoming County, New York